"Women hold up half the sky" is a famous quote by former Chinese Communist Party chairman Mao Zedong. Half the sky or Women Hold Up Half the Sky may refer to:
 Half the Sky, a 2009 book by Nicholas Kristof and Sheryl WuDunn
 Half the Sky movement, inspired by the Kristof–WuDunn book
 Half the Sky Feminist Theatre, a Canadian theatre group
 Women Hold Up Half the Sky, a 1978 artwork by Australian artist Ann Newmarch
 Women Hold Up Half the Sky, 1995 exhibition and book at the National Gallery of Australia
 Women hold up half the sky: The orientation of art in the post-war Pacific, a 1996 exhibition and book at the Monash University Gallery
 Women Hold Up Half the Sky, a 1986 album by Ruby Turner
 Women Hold Up Half the Sky a 1991  book of African feminist theology published by Cluster Publications
 Women Hold Up Half the Sky, a 2012 Exhibition at the South African History Archive

See also
 The Other Half of the Sky: A China Memoir, a 1975 American documentary film